Major-General Sir David Dawnay  (10 July 19039 October 1971) was a British Army officer who became Commandant of the Royal Military Academy Sandhurst. He was also a British polo player who competed in the 1936 Summer Olympics.

Military career
Born the son of Major the Hon. Hugh Dawnay, son of the 8th Viscount Downe and Lady Susan de la Poer Beresford, daughter of the 5th Marquess of Waterford and educated at Eton and the Royal Military College, Sandhurst, Dawnay was commissioned into the Rifle Brigade in 1924 and then transferred to the 10th Royal Hussars later that year. He was part of the British polo team which won the silver medal in the 1936 Summer Olympics: he played both matches in the tournament, the first against Mexico and the final against Argentina.

Dawnay served in the Second World War as Commanding Officer of the 2nd Reconnaissance Regiment and then as Commanding Officer of the North Irish Horse in 1941. After serving as Second in Command of 23rd Armoured Brigade and then of 26th Armoured Brigade in 1943, he became Commander of 21st Army Tank Brigade in 1944 and then Commander of 26th Armoured Brigade in 1945.

After the War he became Commander of 86th Area based at Venice in Italy and then Commander of 2nd Armoured Brigade. He was made Deputy Commander of North Midland District in 1948, Commander of 8th Armoured Brigade in November 1948 and Commandant of the Royal Military Academy Sandhurst in January 1951. His last appointment was as 56th (London) Armoured Division in March 1954 before retiring in April 1957.

In retirement he was Secretary to the Ascot Authority and Clerk of the Course at Ascot.

Family
In 1926 Dawnay married his cousin Lady Katharine Nora de la Poer Beresford, daughter of Henry de la Poer Beresford, 6th Marquess of Waterford and Lady Beatrix Frances Petty-FitzMaurice; they had two daughters and two sons. His son Major Hugh Dawnay was a well known polo player and respected coach whose son, Sebastian Dawnay, is also a professional polo player.  Hugh's twin, Peter, married Caroline, daughter of Group Captain Nicolas Tindal-Carill-Worsley.

References

Bibliography

External links
Generals of World War II

|-
 

1903 births
1971 deaths
British Army major generals
Rifle Brigade officers
10th Royal Hussars officers
Knights Commander of the Royal Victorian Order
Companions of the Order of the Bath
Companions of the Distinguished Service Order
People educated at Eton College
Graduates of the Royal Military College, Sandhurst
Commandants of Sandhurst
Reconnaissance Corps officers
North Irish Horse officers
British Army brigadiers of World War II
English polo players
Olympic polo players of Great Britain
Polo players at the 1936 Summer Olympics
Olympic silver medallists for Great Britain
Roehampton Trophy
Medalists at the 1936 Summer Olympics
David
Olympic medalists in polo